Red Mountain Lake is a small, man-made lake located in Red Mountain Park in Mesa, Arizona, United States, roughly between Power and Ellsworth Roads at Brown Road. It covers 8 acres and has a maximum depth of 17 feet.

Fish species
 Rainbow Trout
 Largemouth Bass
 Sunfish
 Catfish (Channel)
 Carp

References

External links
 Red Mountain Lake

Reservoirs in Arizona
Reservoirs in Maricopa County, Arizona